Lake Elphinstone is a natural lake in Queensland, Australia. The lake used to support the town of Elphinstone, however the town no longer exists, and the lake is a recreation area popular for bird-watching, fishing and camping.

See also

List of lakes of Australia

References

External links

Elphinstone, Lake
North Queensland